From March 12 to June 11, 1968, voters of the Republican Party chose its nominee for president in the 1968 United States presidential election. Former vice president Richard Nixon was selected as the nominee through a series of primary elections and caucuses culminating in the 1968 Republican National Convention held from August 5 to August 8, 1968, in Miami Beach, Florida.

Schedule and results

 Italics - Write-In Votes

Candidates
The following political leaders were candidates for the 1968 Republican presidential nomination:

Major candidates
These candidates participated in multiple state primaries or were included in multiple major national polls.

Favorite sons
The following candidates ran only in their home state's primary, caucus, or convention. They ran for the purpose of controlling their state's respective delegate slate at the national convention and did not appear to be considered national candidates by the media. The media referred to them as "favorite son" candidates.

Governor Spiro Agnew of Maryland (endorsed Nixon)
Governor Dewey F. Bartlett of Oklahoma (endorsed Nixon)
Senator Frank Carlson of Kansas
Senator Clifford Case of New Jersey
Governor Daniel J. Evans of Washington
Senator Hiram Fong of Hawaii (endorsed Nixon)
Governor Wally Hickel of Alaska (endorsed Nixon)
Governor James A. Rhodes of Ohio (endorsed Rockefeller)

Governor Raymond P. Shafer of Pennsylvania (endorsed Rockefeller)
Senator John Tower of Texas (endorsed Nixon)
Senator Strom Thurmond of South Carolina (endorsed Nixon)
Governor John Volpe of Massachusetts (endorsed Nixon)

Declined to run
The following persons were listed in two or more major national polls or were the subject of media speculation surrounding their potential candidacy, but declined to actively seek the nomination.

Senator Everett Dirksen of Illinois
Retired Lt. General James M. Gavin
Former Governor John Davis Lodge of Connecticut  (endorsed Nixon)
Former Senator Barry Goldwater of Arizona (ran for U.S. Senate)
Senator Mark Hatfield of Oregon
Governor Claude R. Kirk, Jr. of Florida (endorsed Rockefeller)
Mayor of New York City John Lindsay (endorsed Rockefeller)
Ambassador Henry Cabot Lodge Jr. of Massachusetts (endorsed Reagan)
Senator Thruston Ballard Morton of Kentucky (endorsed Rockefeller)
Senator Charles H. Percy of Illinois (endorsed Rockefeller)
Former Governor William Scranton of Pennsylvania
Representative Robert Taft Jr. of Ohio

Polling

National polling

Before November 1966

After November 1966

Head-to-head polling 
Nixon v. Romney

Statewide polling

New Hampshire

Primary race
Nixon was the front-runner for the Republican nomination and to a great extent the story of the Republican primary campaign and nomination is the story of one Nixon opponent after another entering the race and then dropping out.

Nixon's first challenger was Michigan Governor George W. Romney. A Gallup poll in mid-1967 showed Nixon with 39%, followed by Romney with 25%. However, in a slip of the tongue, Romney told a news reporter that he had been "brainwashed" by the military and the diplomatic corps into supporting the Vietnam War; the remark led to weeks of ridicule in the national news media. As the year 1968 opened, Romney was opposed to further American intervention in Vietnam and had decided to run as the Republican version of Eugene McCarthy (The New York Times 2/18/1968). Romney's support slowly faded and he withdrew from the race on February 28, 1968. (The New York Times 2/29/1968).

Questions were occasionally asked about Romney's eligibility to hold the office of President due to his birth in Mexico, given an asserted ambiguity in the United States Constitution over the phrase "natural-born citizen".
By February 1967, some newspapers were questioning Romney's eligibility given his Mexican birth.

He departed the race before the matter could be more definitively resolved.

Nixon won a resounding victory in the important New Hampshire primary on March 12, winning 78% of the vote. Anti-war Republicans wrote in the name of New York Governor Nelson Rockefeller, the leader of the GOP's liberal wing, who received 11% of the vote and became Nixon's new challenger. Nixon led Rockefeller in the polls throughout the primary campaign. Rockefeller defeated Nixon in the Massachusetts primary on April 30 but otherwise fared poorly in the state primaries and conventions.

By early spring, California Governor Ronald Reagan, the leader of the GOP's conservative wing, had become Nixon's chief rival. In the Nebraska primary on May 14, Nixon won with 70% of the vote to 21% for Reagan and 5% for Rockefeller. While this was a wide margin for Nixon, Reagan remained Nixon's leading challenger. Nixon won the next primary of importance, Oregon, on May 15 with 65% of the vote and won all the following primaries except for California (June 4), where only Reagan appeared on the ballot. Reagan's margin in California gave him a plurality of the nationwide primary vote, but when the Republican National Convention assembled, Nixon had 656 delegates according to a UPI poll (with 667 needed for the nomination).

Total popular vote

 Ronald Reagan – 1,696,632 (37.93%)
 Richard Nixon – 1,679,443 (37.54%)
 James A. Rhodes – 614,492 (13.74%)
 Nelson A. Rockefeller – 164,340 (3.67%)
 Unpledged – 140,639 (3.14%)
 Eugene McCarthy (write-in) – 44,520 (1.00%)
 Harold Stassen – 31,655 (0.71%)
 John Volpe – 31,465 (0.70%)
 Others – 21,456 (0.51%)
 George Wallace (write-in) – 15,291 (0.34%)
 Robert F. Kennedy (write-in) – 14,524 (0.33%)
 Hubert Humphrey (write-in) – 5,698 (0.13)
 Lyndon Johnson (write-in) – 4,824 (0.11%)
 George Romney – 4,447 (0.10%)
 Raymond P. Shafer – 1,223 (0.03%)
 William W. Scranton – 724 (0.02%)
 Charles H. Percy – 689 (0.02%)
 Barry M. Goldwater – 598 (0.01%)
 John V. Lindsay – 591 (0.01%)

Endorsements

U.S. Senators
 George Aiken, (R-VT)
 Edward Brooke, (R-MA)
 Clifford Case, (R-NJ)
 John Sherman Cooper, (R-KY)
 Jacob Javits, (R-NY)
 Kenneth Keating, (R-NY)
 Thomas Kuchel, (R-CA)
 Thruston Morton, (R-KY)
 James B. Pearson, (R-KS)
 Charles H. Percy, (R-IL)
 Hugh Scott, (R-PA)

U.S. Representatives
 Mark Andrews, (R-ND)
 Alphonzo Bell, (R-CA)
 Edward Biester, (R-PA)
 Silvio O. Conte, (R-MA)
 Seymour Halpern, (R-NY)
 John Lindsay, (R-NY)
 Charles Mathias, (R-MD)
 Pete McCloskey, (R-CA)
 William E. Miller, (R-NY)
 Richard Schweiker, (R-PA)
 Charles Whalen, (R-OH)

Governors
 Daniel J. Evans, (R-WA)
 Tom McCall, (R-OR)
 Winthrop Rockefeller, (R-AR)
 George W. Romney, (R-MI)
 Raymond P. Shafer, (R-PA)

The convention
At the 1968 Republican National Convention in Miami Beach, Florida, Reagan and Rockefeller planned to unite their forces in a stop-Nixon movement, but the strategy fell apart when neither man agreed to support the other for the nomination. Nixon won the nomination on the first ballot. Nixon then chose Maryland Governor Spiro Agnew to be his Vice-Presidential candidate, despite complaints from within the GOP that Agnew was an unknown quantity, and that a better-known and more popular candidate, such as Romney, should have been the Vice-Presidential nominee. 
It was also reported that Nixon's first choice for running mate was his longtime friend and ally, Robert Finch, who was Lt. Governor of California since 1967 and later his HEW Secretary, but Finch declined the offer.

See also 
1968 Democratic Party presidential primaries

Notes

References

Bibliography